Canada's National Observer (CNO) is a news website that features daily news, analysis and opinion on energy, climate, politics, and social issues. Its owner, Observer Media Group, is a certified B Corporation. By 2015, CNO had a Vancouver office and later opened offices in Ottawa and Toronto.

History 
In its 2016 Kickstarter campaign, CNO described the journalism it set out to do as a "dramatic new series about the world's fight to beat climate change." The original team included Charles Mandel, Elizabeth McSheffrey, Bruce Livesey, Sandy Garossino, Jenny Uechi, Mike De Souza, Valentina Ruiz Leotaud, and Bruno De Bondt, with Linda Solomon Wood as editor-in-chief." The campaign crowdsourced $70,863 from 784 backers. The 2016 Kickstarter campaign listed issues that CNO's investigative journalists would cover, including the role of corporations that impede change, climate policies related to the 2015 Paris Agreement, food security, the oil sands, hydraulic fracturing in Canada, and animal welfare. The centrepiece of CNO's launch was Bruce Livesey's May 4, 2015 article, "How Canada made the Koch brothers rich.". On January 1, 2016, CNO published the first in a special series of articles on the Great Bear Rainforest in partnership with Tides Canada, Teck, and Vancity.

In a 2016 article, National Post columnist Terence Corcoran described a "newspaper war" between the Postmedia Network and the Toronto Star. He criticized Torstar's "series of personal and corporate attacks" against Postmedia, in particular CNO reporter Bruce Livesey's massive "5,000-word take down" of Postmedia. Livesey's article was published in both the CNO and in the Star. Corcoran said Livesey was "a master of the inappropriate juxtaposition of fact and conclusion" and called the CNO a "left-wing Vancouver online magazine".

In October 2017, CNO teamed up with The Toronto Star, Global News, the Michener Awards Foundation, the University of Victoria-led Corporate Mapping Project and four journalism schools for "the largest collaborative journalism project in Canadian history." The "Price of Oil" project was created for the purpose of "tracking oil industry influence in partnership with investigative journalism students from across the country."

See also 
 The Vancouver Observer

Notes

References 

Canadian news websites
Online magazines published in Canada
Political magazines published in Canada
Magazines established in 2015
Magazines published in Vancouver
News magazines published in Canada
B Lab-certified corporations